KSIF may refer to:

 KSIF (FM), a radio station (91.7 FM) licensed to serve Wellington, Texas, United States
 Rockingham County NC Shiloh Airport (ICAO code KSIF)